The Squatter's Cabin is the only remnant of the Kaweah Colony, a socialist utopian group established in the Sierra Nevada in the 1880s.  Now located in Sequoia National Park, the one-room log structure is located at Huckleberry Meadow near the Giant Forest.

References

External links 

United States Park Service publication about Kaweah Colony

Houses on the National Register of Historic Places in California
National Register of Historic Places in Sequoia National Park
Houses in Tulare County, California
Log cabins in the United States
1886 establishments in California
Log buildings and structures on the National Register of Historic Places in California